Ann-Margreth Frei, Frei-Käck, or Frei-Hall, (born March 20, 1942) is a Swedish former competitive figure skater. She is a two-time Nordic champion and a three-time Swedish national champion. She competed for Sweden at the 1964 Winter Olympics in Innsbruck, placing 21st.

Frei lived in Switzerland from the age of six to 18. As of 2016, she is a coach at the Skating Club of Vail in Vail, Colorado.

Competitive highlights

References 

1942 births
Figure skaters at the 1964 Winter Olympics
Swedish female single skaters
Living people
People from Kalmar
Swedish emigrants to the United States
Olympic figure skaters of Sweden
Sportspeople from Kalmar County
20th-century Swedish women